Reza Shah Pahlavi (originally Reza Khan; 15 March 1878 – 26 July 1944) was an Iranian military officer, politician (who served as minister of war and prime minister), and first shah of the House of Pahlavi of the Imperial State of Iran and father of the last shah of Iran. He reigned from 15 December 1925 until he was forced to abdicate by the Anglo-Soviet invasion of Iran on 16 September 1941. Reza Shah introduced many social, economic, and political reforms during his reign, ultimately laying the foundation of the modern Iranian state. Therefore, he is regarded as the founder of modern Iran.

At the age of 14 he joined the Iranian Cossack Brigade, and also served in the army. In 1911, he was promoted to first lieutenant, by 1912 he was elevated to the rank of captain and by 1915 he became a colonel. In February 1921, as leader of the entire Cossack Brigade based in Qazvin, he marched towards Tehran and seized the capital. He forced the dissolution of the government and installed Zia ol Din Tabatabaee as the new prime minister. Reza Khan's first role in the new government was commander-in-chief of the army and the minister of war.

Two years after the coup, Seyyed Zia appointed Reza Pahlavi as Iran's prime minister, backed by the compliant national assembly of Iran. In 1925, Reza Pahlavi was appointed as the legal monarch of Iran by the decision of Iran's constituent assembly. The assembly deposed Ahmad Shah Qajar, the last Shah of the Qajar dynasty, and amended Iran's 1906 constitution to allow selection of Reza Pahlavi as the Shah of Iran. He founded the Pahlavi dynasty that lasted until overthrown in 1979 during the Iranian Revolution.

In the spring of 1950, he was posthumously named as Reza Shah the Great by Iran's National Consultative Assembly.

His legacy remains controversial to this day. His defenders assert that he was an essential reunification modernization force for Iran (whose international prominence had sharply declined during Qajar rule), while his detractors assert that his reign was often despotic, with his failure to modernize Iran's large peasant population eventually sowing the seeds for the Iranian Revolution nearly four decades later, which ended 2,500 years of Iranian monarchy. Moreover, his insistence on ethnic nationalism and cultural unitarism, along with forced detribalization and sedentarization, resulted in the suppression of several ethnic and social groups. Although he himself was of Iranian Mazanderani descent, his government carried out an extensive policy of Persianization trying to create a single, united and largely homogeneous nation, similar to Mustafa Kemal Atatürk's policy of Turkification in Turkey after the fall of the Ottoman Empire.

Early life

Reza Shah Pahlavi was born in the town of Alasht in Savadkuh County, Mazandaran Province, in 1878, to son of Major Abbas-Ali Khan and wife Noush-Afarin. His mother was a Georgian Muslim immigrant from Georgia (then part of the Russian Empire), whose family had emigrated to Qajar Iran when it was forced to cede all of its territories in the Caucasus following the Russo-Persian Wars several decades prior to Reza Shah's birth. His father was a Mazanderani, commissioned in the 7th Savadkuh Regiment, and served in the Siege of Herat in 1856. Abbas-Ali died suddenly on 26 November 1878, when Reza was barely 8 months old. Upon his father's death, Reza and his mother moved to her brother's house in Tehran. She remarried in 1879 and left Reza to the care of his uncle. In 1882, his uncle in turn sent Reza to a family friend, Amir Tuman Kazim Khan, an officer in the Persian Cossack Brigade, in whose home he had a room of his own and a chance to study with Kazim Khan's children with the tutors who came to the house. When Reza was sixteen years old, he joined the Persian Cossack Brigade. In 1903, when he was 25 years old, he is reported to have been guard and servant to the Dutch consul general Fridolin Marinus Knobel.

He also served in the Imperial Army. His initial career started as a private under Qajar Prince Abdol-Hossein Farman Farma's command. Farman Farma noted that Reza had potential and sent him to military school where he gained the rank of gunnery sergeant. In 1911, he gave a good account of himself in later campaigns and was promoted to First Lieutenant. His proficiency in handling machine guns elevated him to the rank equivalent to captain in 1912. By 1915, he was promoted to the rank of Colonel. His record of military service eventually led him to a commission as a brigadier general in the Persian Cossack Brigade. He was the last commanding officer of the Brigade, and the only Iranian commander in its history, succeeding to this position the Russian colonel Vsevolod Starosselsky, whom Reza Shah had helped, in 1918, take over the brigade.

In November 1919, he chose the last name Pahlavi for himself, which later became the name of the dynasty he founded.

Rise to power

1921 coup

In the aftermath of the Russian Revolution, Persia had become a battleground. In 1917, Britain used Iran as the springboard for the launching of an expedition into Russia as part of their intervention in the Russian Civil War on the side of the White movement. The Soviet Union responded by annexing portions of northern Persia, creating the Persian Socialist Soviet Republic. The Soviets extracted ever more humiliating concessions from the Qajar government, whose ministers Ahmad Shah was often unable to control. By 1920, the government had lost virtually all power outside its capital: British and Soviet forces exercised control over most of the Iranian mainland.

In late 1920, the Soviets in Rasht prepared to march on Tehran with "a guerrilla force of 1,500 Jangalis, Kurds, Armenians, and Azerbaijanis", reinforced by the Soviet Red Army. This, along with various other unrest in the country, created "an acute political crisis in the capital."

On 14 January 1921, the commander of the British Forces in Iran, General Edmund "Tiny" Ironside, promoted Reza Khan, who had been leading the Tabriz battalion, to lead the entire brigade. About a month later, under British direction, Reza Khan led his 3,000-4,000 strong detachment of the Cossack Brigade, based in Niyarak, Qazvin, and Hamadan, to Tehran and seized the capital. He forced the dissolution of the previous government and demanded that Zia ol Din Tabatabaee be appointed Prime Minister. Reza Khan's first role in the new government was as commander of the Iranian Army, which he combined with the post of Minister of War. He took the title Sardar Sepah, or Commander-in-Chief of the Army, by which he was known until he became Shah. While Reza Khan and his Cossack brigade secured Tehran, the Persian envoy in Moscow negotiated a treaty with the Bolsheviks for the removal of Soviet troops from Persia. Article IV of the Russo-Persian Treaty of Friendship allowed the Soviets to invade and occupy Persia, should they believe foreign troops were using it as a staging area for an invasion of Soviet territory. As Soviets interpreted the treaty, they could invade if events in Persia should prove threatening to Soviet national security. This treaty would cause enormous tension between the two nations until the Anglo-Soviet Invasion of Iran.

The coup d'état of 1921 was partially assisted by the British government, which wished to halt the Bolsheviks' penetration of Iran, particularly because of the threat it posed to the British possessions in India. It is thought that the British provided "ammunition, supplies and pay" for Reza's troops. On 8 June 1932, a British Embassy report states that the British were interested in helping Reza Shah create a centralizing power. General Ironside gave a situation report to the British War Office saying that a capable Persian officer was in command of the Cossacks and this "would solve many difficulties and enable us to depart in peace and honour".

Reza Khan spent the rest of 1921 securing Iran's interior, responding to a number of revolts that erupted against the new government. Among the greatest threats to the new administration were the Persian Soviet Socialist Republic, which had been established in Gilan, and the Kurds of Khorasan.

Overthrow of the Qajar dynasty

From the beginning of the appointment of Reza Khan as the minister of war, there was ever increasing tension with Zia ol Din Tabatabaee, who was prime minister at the time. Zia ol Din Tabatabaee wrongly calculated that when Reza Khan was appointed as the minister of war, he would relinquish his post as the head of the Persian Cossack Brigade, and that Reza Khan would wear civilian clothing instead of the military attire. This erroneous calculation by Zia ol Din Tabatabaee backfired and instead it was apparent to people who observed Reza Khan, including members of parliament, that he (and not Zia ol Din Tabatabaee) was the one who wielded power.

By 1923, Reza Khan had largely succeeded in securing Iran's interior from any remaining domestic and foreign threats. Upon his return to the capital he was appointed Prime Minister, which prompted Ahmad Shah to leave Iran for Europe, where he would remain (at first voluntarily, and later in exile) until his death. It induced the Parliament to grant Reza Khan dictatorial powers, who in turn assumed the symbolic and honorific styles of Janab-i-Ashraf (His Serene Highness) and Hazrat-i-Ashraf on 28 October 1923. He quickly established a political cabinet in Tehran to help organize his plans for modernization and reform.

By October 1925, he succeeded in pressuring the Majlis to depose and formally exile Ahmad Shah, and instate him as the next Shah of Iran. Initially, he had planned to declare the country a republic, as his contemporary Atatürk had done in Turkey, but abandoned the idea in the face of British and clerical opposition.

The Majlis, convening as a constituent assembly, declared him the Shah (King) of Iran on 12 December 1925, pursuant to the Persian Constitution of 1906. Three days later, on 15 December, he took his imperial oath and thus became the first shah of the Pahlavi dynasty. Reza Shah's coronation took place much later, on 25 April 1926. It was at that time that his son, Mohammad Reza Pahlavi, was proclaimed crown prince.

Rule as the Shah

While the Shah left behind no major thesis, or speeches giving an overarching policy, his reforms indicated a striving for an Iran which—according to scholar Ervand Abrahamian—would be "free of clerical influence, nomadic uprisings, and ethnic differences", on the one hand, and on the other hand would contain "European-style educational institutions, Westernized women active outside the home, and modern economic structures with state factories, communication networks, investment banks, and department stores."
Reza is said to have avoided political participation and consultation with politicians or political personalities, instead embracing the slogan "every country has its own ruling system and ours is a one man system." He is also said to have preferred punishment to reward in dealing with subordinates or citizens.

Reza Shah's reign has been said to have consisted of "two distinct periods". From 1925 to 1933, figures such as Abdolhossein Teymourtash, Nosrat ol Dowleh Firouz, and Ali-Akbar Davar and many other western-educated Iranians emerged to implement modernist plans, such as the construction of railways, a modern judiciary and educational system, and the imposition of changes in traditional attire, and traditional and religious customs and mores. In the second half of his reign (1933–41), which the Shah described as "one-man rule", strong personalities like Davar and Teymourtash were removed, and secularist and Western policies and plans initiated earlier were implemented.

Modernization

During Reza Shah's sixteen years of rule, major developments, such as large road construction projects and the Trans-Iranian Railway were built, modern education was introduced and the University of Tehran, the first Iranian university, was established. The government sponsored European education for many Iranian students The number of modern industrial plants increased 17-fold under Reza Shah (excluding oil installations), and the number of miles of highway increased from 2,000 to 14,000.

Along with the modernization of the nation, Reza Shah was the ruler during the time of the Women's Awakening (1936–1941). This movement sought the elimination of the chador from Iranian working society. Supporters held that the veil impeded physical exercise and the ability of women to enter society and contribute to the progress of the nation. This move met opposition from the Mullahs from the religious establishment. The unveiling issue and the Women's Awakening are linked to the Marriage Law of 1931 and the Second Congress of Eastern Women in Tehran in 1932.

Reza Shah was the first Iranian Monarch in 1400 years who paid respect to the Jews by praying in the synagogue when visiting the Jewish community of Isfahan; an act that boosted the self-esteem of the Iranian Jews and made Reza Shah their second most respected Iranian leader after Cyrus the Great. Reza Shah's reforms opened new occupations to Jews and allowed them to leave the ghetto. This point of view, however, may be refuted by the claims that the anti-Jewish incidents of September 1922 in parts of Tehran was a plot by Reza Khan.

He forbade photographing aspects of Iran he considered backwards such as camels, and he banned clerical dress and chadors in favor of Western dress.

Parliament and ministers

Parliamentary elections during the Shah's reign were not democratic. The general practice was to "draw up, with the help of the police chief, a list of parliamentary candidates for the interior minister. The interior minister then passed the same names onto the provincial governor-general. ... [who] handed down the list to the supervisory electoral councils that were packed by the Interior Ministry to oversee the ballots. Parliament ceased to be a meaningful institution, and instead became a decorative garb covering the nakedness of military rule."

Reza Shah discredited and eliminated a number of his ministers. His minister of Imperial Court, Abdolhossein Teymourtash, was accused and convicted of corruption, bribery, misuse of foreign currency regulations, and plans to overthrow the Shah. He was removed as the minister of court in 1932 and died under suspicious circumstances while in prison in September 1933. The minister of finance, Prince Firouz Nosrat-ed-Dowleh III, who played an important role in the first three years of his reign, was convicted on similar charges in May 1930, and also died in prison, in January 1938. Ali-Akbar Davar, his minister of justice, was suspected of similar charges and committed suicide in February 1937. The elimination of these ministers "deprived" Iran "of her most dynamic figures ... and the burden of government fell heavily on Reza Shah" according to historian Cyrus Ghani.

Replacement of Persia with Iran

In the Western world, Persia (or its cognates) was historically the common name for Iran. In 1935, Reza Shah asked foreign delegates and League of Nations to use the term Iran ("Land of the Aryans"), the endonym of the country, used by its native people, in formal correspondence. Since then, in the Western World, the use of the word "Iran" has become more common. This also changed the usage of the names for the Iranian nationality, and the common adjective for citizens of Iran changed from Persian to Iranian. In 1959, the government of Shah Mohammad Reza Pahlavi, Reza Shah Pahlavi's son and successor, announced that both "Persia" and "Iran" could officially be used interchangeably, nonetheless use of "Iran" continued to subplant "Persia", especially in the West. Though the predominant and official language of the country was the Persian language, many did not consider themselves ethnic Persians, whereas "Iranians" made for a much more neutral and unifying reference to all the ethnic groups of Iran, further, "Persia" (locally known as Pars) was geographically confusing at times as it was also the name of one of Iran's significant cultural provinces.  Although (internally) the country had been referred to as Iran throughout much of its history since the Sasanian Empire, many countries including the English-speaking world knew the country as Persia, largely a legacy of the Ancient Greeks name for the Achaemenid Empire.

Support and opposition
Support for the Shah came principally from three sources. The central "pillar" was the military, where the shah had begun his career. The annual defense budget of Iran "increased more than fivefold from 1926 to 1941." Officers were paid more than other salaried employees. The new modern and expanded state bureaucracy of Iran was another source of support. Its ten civilian ministries employed 90,000 full-time government workers. Patronage controlled by the Shah's royal court served as the third "pillar". This was financed by the Shah's considerable personal wealth which had been built up by forced sales and confiscations of estates, making him "the richest man in Iran". On his abdication Reza Shah "left to his heir a bank account of some three million pounds sterling and estates totaling over 3 million acres."

Opposition to the Shah came not so much from the landed upper class as from "the tribes, the clergy, and the young generation of the new intelligentsia. The tribes bore the brunt of the new order."

Clash with the clergy
As his reign became more secure, Reza Shah clashed with Iran's clergy and devout Muslims on many issues. In March 1928, he violated the sanctuary of Qom's Fatima Masumeh Shrine to beat a cleric who had angrily admonished Reza Shah's wife for temporarily exposing her face a day earlier while on pilgrimage to Qom. In December of that year he instituted a law requiring everyone (except Shia jurisconsults who had passed a special qualifying examination) to wear Western clothes. This angered devout Muslims because it included a hat with a brim which prevented the devout from touching their foreheads on the ground during salat as required by Islamic law. The Shah also encouraged women to discard hijab. He announced that female teachers could no longer come to school with head coverings. One of his daughters reviewed a girls' athletic event with an uncovered head.

The devout were also angered by policies that allowed mixing of the sexes. Women were allowed to study in the colleges of law and medicine, and in 1934 a law set heavy fines for cinemas, restaurant, and hotels that did not open their doors to both sexes. Doctors were permitted to dissect human bodies. He restricted public mourning observances to one day and required mosques to use chairs instead of the traditional sitting on the floors of mosques.

By the mid-1930s, Reza Shah's rule had caused intense dissatisfaction of the Shia clergy throughout Iran. In 1935, a rebellion erupted in the Imam Reza Shrine in Mashhad. Responding to a cleric who denounced the Shah's "heretical" innovations, corruption and heavy consumer taxes, many bazaaris and villagers took refuge in the shrine, chanting slogans such as "The Shah is a new Yezid." For four full days local police and army refused to violate the shrine. The standoff was ended when troops from Iranian Azerbaijan arrived and broke into the shrine, killing dozens and injuring hundreds, and marking a final rupture between the clergy and the Shah. Some of the Mashed clergy even left their jobs, such as the Keeper of the Keys of the shrine Hassan Mazloumi, later named Barjesteh, who stated he did not want to listen to the orders of a dog.

The Shah intensified his controversial changes following the incident with the Kashf-e hijab decree, banning the chador and ordering all citizens – rich and poor – to bring their wives to public functions without head coverings.

Foreign affairs and influence

Reza Shah initiated change in foreign affairs as well. He worked to balance British influence with other foreigners and generally to diminish foreign influence in Iran.

One of the first acts of the new government after the 1921 entrance into Tehran was to tear up the treaty with the Soviet Union. The Bolsheviks condemned the aggressive foreign policy of Imperial Russia, promised never to interfere in Persia's internal affairs, but reserved the right to occupy it temporarily in the event another power used Persia for an attack on Soviet Russia.

In 1934 he made an official state visit to Turkey and met Turkish President Mustafa Kemal Atatürk. During their meeting Reza Shah spoke in Azerbaijani, and Atatürk in Turkish.

In 1931, he refused to allow Imperial Airways to fly in Persian airspace, instead giving the concession to German-owned Lufthansa Airlines. The next year, 1932, he surprised the British by unilaterally canceling the oil concession awarded to William Knox D'Arcy (and the Anglo-Persian Oil Company), which was slated to expire in 1961. The concession granted Persia 16% of the net profits from APOC oil operations. The Shah wanted 21%. The British took the dispute before the League of Nations. However, before a decision was made by the League, the company and Iran compromised and a new concession was signed on 26 April 1933.

He previously hired American consultants to develop and implement Western-style financial and administrative systems. Among them was U.S. economist Arthur Millspaugh, who acted as the nation's finance minister. Reza Shah also purchased ships from Italy and hired Italians to teach his troops the intricacies of naval warfare. He also imported hundreds of German technicians and advisors for various projects. Mindful of Persia's long period of subservience to British and Russian authority, Reza Shah was careful to avoid giving any one foreign nation too much control. He also insisted that foreign advisors be employed by the Persian government, so that they would not be answerable to foreign powers. This was based upon his experience with Anglo-Persian, which was owned and operated by the British government.

In his campaign against foreign influence, he annulled the 19th-century capitulations to Europeans in 1928. Under these, Europeans in Iran had enjoyed the privilege of being subject to their own consular courts rather than to the Iranian judiciary. The right to print money was moved from the British Imperial Bank to his National Bank of Iran (Bank-i Melli Iran), as was the administration of the telegraph system, from the Indo-European Telegraph Company to the Iranian government, in addition to the collection of customs by Belgian officials. He eventually fired Millspaugh, and prohibited foreigners from administering schools, owning land or traveling in the provinces without police permission.

Not all observers agree that the Shah minimized foreign influence. One complaint about his development program was that the north–south railway line he had built was uneconomical, only serving the British, who had a military presence in the south of Iran and desired the ability to transfer their troops north to Russia, as part of their strategic defence plan. In contrast, the Shah's regime did not develop what critics believe was an economically justifiable east–west railway system.

On 21 March 1935, he issued a decree asking foreign delegates to use the term Iran in formal correspondence, as Persia is a term used for a country identified as Iran in the Persian language. It was, however, attributed more to the Iranian people than others, as Iran means "Land of the Aryans". This wisdom of this decision continues to be debated.

Tired of the opportunistic policies of both Britain and the Soviet Union, the Shah circumscribed contacts with foreign embassies. Relations with the Soviet Union had already deteriorated because of that country's commercial policies, which in the 1920s and 1930s adversely affected Iran. In 1932, the Shah offended Britain by canceling the agreement under which the Anglo-Persian Oil Company produced and exported Iran's oil. Although a new and improved agreement was eventually signed, it did not satisfy Iran's demands and left bad feeling on both sides.

To counterbalance British and Soviet influence, Reza Shah encouraged German commercial enterprise in Iran. On the eve of World War II, Germany was Iran's largest trading partner. The Germans agreed to sell the Shah the steel factory he coveted and considered a sine qua non of progress and modernity. Reza Shah's foreign policy, which had consisted largely on playing the Soviet Union off against the United Kingdom, failed when the German invasion of the USSR in 1941, resulted in those two powers becoming sudden allies in the fight against the Axis powers. Seeking to guarantee the continued supply for to United Kingdom and in order to secure a route of supply to provide Soviet forces with  war material, the two allies jointly launched a  surprise invasion in August 1941. Caught off guard, out gunned and diplomatically isolated, Reza Shah decided not to the resist the Anglo-Soviet invasion, ordering his forces to surrender before agreeing to abdicate the throne in favor of his son. Reza Shah then went into exile while Iran would remain under Allied occupation until 1946.

Later years of reign

The Shah's reign is sometimes divided into periods. All the worthwhile efforts of Reza Shah's reign were either completed or conceived in the 1925–1938 period, a period during which he required the assistance of reformists to gain the requisite legitimacy to consolidate this modern reign. In particular, Abdolhossein Teymourtash assisted by Farman Farma, Ali-Akbar Davar and a large number of modern educated Iranians, proved adept at masterminding the implementation of many reforms demanded since the failed constitutional revolution of 1905–1911. The preservation and promotion of the country's historic heritage, the provision of public education, construction of a national railway, abolition of capitulation agreements, and the establishment of a national bank had all been advocated by intellectuals since the tumult of the constitutional revolution.

The later years of his reign were dedicated to institutionalizing the educational system of Iran and also to the industrialization of the country. He knew that the system of the constitutional monarchy in Iran after him had to stand on a solid basis of the collective participation of all Iranians, and that it was indispensable to create educational centers all over Iran.

Reza Shah attempted to forge a regional alliance with Iran's Middle Eastern neighbors, particularly Turkey. The death of Ataturk in 1938, followed by the start of World War II shortly thereafter, prevented these projects from being realized.

The parliament assented to his decrees, the free press was suppressed, and the swift incarceration of political leaders like Mossadegh, the murder of others such as Teymourtash, Sardar Asad, Firouz, Modarres, Arbab Keikhosro and the suicide of Davar, ensured that any progress towards democratization was stillborn and organized opposition to the Shah, impossible. Reza Shah treated the urban middle class, the managers, and technocrats with an iron fist; as a result his state-owned industries remained underproductive and inefficient. The bureaucracy fell apart, since officials preferred sycophancy, when anyone could be whisked away to prison for even the whiff of disobeying his whims. He confiscated land from the Qajars and from his rivals and into his own estates. The corruption continued under his rule and even became institutionalized. Progress toward modernization was spotty and isolated as it could only take place with Shah's approval. Eventually the Shah became totally dependent on the military and secret police to retain power; in return, these state organs regularly received funding up to 50 percent of available public revenue to ensure their loyalty.

Although the landed aristocracy lost most of their influence during Reza Shah's reign, his regime aroused opposition not from them or the gentry but from Iran's: "tribes, the clergy, and the young generation of the new intelligentsia. The tribes bore the brunt of the new order."

World War II and forced abdication

In August 1941 the Allied powers, the United Kingdom, and the Soviet Union invaded and occupied neutral Iran by a massive air, land, and naval assault without a declaration of war. By 28–29 August, the Iranian military situation was in complete chaos. The Allies had complete control over the skies of Iran, and large sections of the country were in their hands. Major Iranian cities (such as Tehran) were suffering repeated air raids. In Tehran itself, the casualties had been light, but the Soviet Air Force dropped leaflets over city, warning the population of an upcoming massive bombing raid and urging them to surrender before they suffered imminent destruction. Tehran's water and food supply had faced shortages, and soldiers fled in fear of the Soviets killing them upon capture. Faced with total collapse, the royal family (except the Shah and the Crown Prince) fled to Isfahan.

The collapse of the army that Reza Shah had spent so much time and effort creating was humiliating. Many Iranian commanders behaved incompetently, others secretly sympathized with the British and sabotaged Iranian resistance. The army generals met in secret to discuss surrender options. When the Shah learned of the generals' actions, he beat armed forces chief General Ahmad Nakhjavan with a cane and physically stripped him of his rank. Nakhjavan was nearly shot by the Shah on the spot, but at the insistence of the Crown Prince, he was sent to prison instead.

The Shah ordered pro-British Prime Minister Ali Mansur, whom he blamed for demoralising the military, to resign, replacing him with former prime minister Mohammad Ali Foroughi.

Within days, Reza Shah ordered the military to cease resistance and entered into negotiations with the British and Soviets. Foroughi was disobliged towards Reza Shah, having been previously forced into retirement years earlier for political reasons with his daughter's father in-law being executed by firing squad. When he entered into negotiations with the British, instead of negotiating a favorable settlement, Foroughi implied that both he and the Iranian people wanted to be "liberated" from the Shah's rule. The British and Foroughi agreed that for the Allies to withdraw, Iran would have to expel the German minister and his staff should leave Tehran; the German, Italian, Hungarian and Romanian legations would be closed; and all remaining German nationals (including all families) would be handed over to the British and Soviet authorities. The last order would mean almost certain imprisonment or, in the case of those handed to the Soviets, possible death. Reza Shah stalled on the last demand, choosing instead to secretly evacuate German nationals from the country. By 18 September, most of the German nationals had escaped via the Turkish border.

In response to the Shah's defiance, the Red Army on 16 September moved to occupy Tehran. Fearing execution by the Communists, many people (especially the wealthy) fled the city. Reza Shah, in a letter handwritten by Foroughi, announced his abdication, as the Soviets entered the city on 17 September. The British wanted to restore the Qajar dynasty to power, but the heir to Ahmad Shah Qajar since that last Qajar Shah's death in 1930, Hamid Hassan Mirza, was a British subject who spoke no Persian. Instead (with the help of Foroughi), Crown Prince Mohammad Reza Pahlavi took the oath to become the Shah of Iran.

The British left the Shah a face-saving way out:

The Anglo-Soviet invasion was instigated in response to Reza for having denied the request to remove the German residents, who could threaten the Abadan refinery. Reza Shah further refused the Allies' requests to expel German nationals residing in Iran, and denied the use of the railway to the Allies. However, according to the British embassy reports from Tehran in 1940, the total number of German citizens in Iran – from technicians to spies – was no more than one thousand. Because of its strategic importance to the Allies, Iran was subsequently called "The Bridge of Victory" by Winston Churchill.

Reza Shah was forced by the invading British to abdicate in favor of his son Mohammad Reza Pahlavi who replaced his father as Shah on the throne on 16 September 1941.

Critics and defenders
Reza Shah's main critics were the so-called "new intelligentsia", often educated in Europe, for whom the Shah "was not a state-builder but an 'oriental despot' ... not a reformer but a plutocrat strengthening the landed upper class; not a real nationalist but a jack-booted Cossack trained by the Tsarists and brought to power by British imperialists." His defenders included Ahmad Kasravi, a contemporary intellectual and historian of constitutional movement, who had strongly criticized participation of Reza Shah in the 1909 siege of Tabriz. When he accepted the unpleasant responsibility of acting as defense attorney for a group of officers accused of torturing political prisoners, he stated; "Our young intellectuals cannot possibly understand and cannot judge the reign of Reza Shah. They cannot because they were too young to remember the chaotic and desperate conditions out of which arose the autocrat named Reza Shah."

Clarmont Skrine, a British civil servant who accompanied Reza Shah on his 1941 journey to British Mauritius, writes in his book, World War in Iran: "Reza Shah Pahlavi, posthumously entitled 'The Great' in the annals of his country was indeed, if not the greatest, at any rate one of the strongest and ablest men Iran has produced in all the two and a half milleniums of her history".

Death

Like his son after him, Reza Shah died in exile. After the United Kingdom and the Soviet Union invaded and occupied Iran on 25 August 1941, the British offered to keep his family in power if Reza Shah agreed to a life of exile. Reza Shah abdicated and the British forces quickly took him and his children to Mauritius, where he lived at Chateau Val d'Ory on Bois-Cheris Road in the Moka neighborhood of Port Louis. Subsequently, he was sent to Durban and then to a house at 41 Young Avenue in the Parktown neighborhood of Johannesburg, South Africa, where he died on 26 July 1944 of a heart ailment about which he had been complaining for many years. His personal doctor had boosted the King's morale in exile by telling him that he was suffering from chronic indigestion and not heart ailment. He lived on a diet of plain rice and boiled chicken in the last years of his life. He was sixty-six years old at the time of his death.

After his death, his body was carried to Egypt, where it was embalmed and kept at the royal Al-Rifa'i Mosque in Cairo (also the future burial place of his son, the exiled Mohammad Reza Pahlavi). In May 1950, the remains were flown back to Iran where the embalming was removed, and buried in a mausoleum built in his honor in the town of Ray, in the southern suburbs of the capital, Tehran. The Iranian parliament (Majlis) later designated the title "the Great" to be added to his name. There were reports that on 14 January 1979, shortly before the Iranian Revolution, the remains were moved back to Egypt and buried in the Al-Rifa'i Mosque in Cairo. However, in a 2015 documentary From Tehran to Cairo, his daughter-in-law, Empress Farah claimed that the remains of the late Reza Shah remain in the town of Ray.

After the 1979 revolution and during the period of the Interim Government of Iran, Iran faced a series of rampages at the hand of an extremist mob led by the cleric Sadeq Khalkhali. During this rampage, happening all over the nation, any construction depicting or even citing the name of the Shah and his family was destroyed. This included the destruction of Reza Shah's mausoleum, but they were unable to find his dead body.

In 2018, a mummified body believed to be Reza Shah's was found in the vicinity of his former mausoleum site in Tehran. An official said that the body belonged to Reza Shah and was buried in the same area.

Amendments and foundations

Under Reza Shah's reign, a number of new concepts were introduced between 1923 and 1941. Some of these significant changes, achievements, concepts and laws included:
 Successful suppression of separatist movements and reunification of Iran under a powerful central government.
 Foundation of the first judicial system of Iran.
 Foundation of the first national health care system and public hospitals across the country.
 Reestablishment of Iranian Gendarmerie and Shahrbani in order to enforce law and order.
 Foundation of Trans-Iranian Railway which connected Caspian Sea to Persian Gulf.
 Nationalizing Iranian forests and jungles.
 Creation of an Iranian modern military. 
 Creation of Iran's first radio stations.
 Founding of the national Museum of Iran.
 Rebuilding Iran's historical sites, including the tombs of Ferdowsi and Hafez.
 Organizing the Ferdowsi Millenary Celebrations to commemorate the thousandth anniversary of Ferdowsi's birth as the savior of Persian language and Iranian identity.
 Creation of Iran's Academy of Persian Language and Literature in order to protect Iran's official language.
 The first scientific excavations at Persepolis, the ancient capital of the Achaemenid Empire, were carried out by the initiative of Reza Shah. Ernst Herzfeld and Erich Schmidt representing the Oriental Institute of the University of Chicago conducted excavations for eight seasons, beginning in 1930, and included other nearby sites.
 Creation of the Iran's first national bank known as Bank Melli Iran and other Iranian banks such as Bank Sepah and Keshavarzi Bank.
 Creation of the first university in Iran which is known as University of Tehran.
 Transferring and providing full scholarships for the Iranian students to European countries for studying abroad.
 Eradication of corruption in civil servants, paying wages in time so people did not have to rely on bribes.
 Creation of the first national school system and schoolbooks in Iran; before Reza Shah Pahlavi, the Islamic madreseh and Quran was the only form of schooling available.
 Establishment of the first Iranian kindergarten and school for deaf people.
 Creation of the Iran Scout Organization.
 Creation of birth certificates and Identification cards for all Iranians.
 Creation of the first Iranian airplane factory with buying license from Germany.
 Building the first Iranian airport known as Mehrabad airport.
 Changing Iranian currency from Toman to Rial.
 Restoring Persian calendar and making it the official calendar of Iran.
 Kashf-e hijab (Unveiling). On 8 January 1936, Reza Shah issued a decree banning all veils (headscarf and chador), an edict that was swiftly and forcefully implemented. The government also banned many types of male traditional clothing.
 In the Western world, Persia (or one of its cognates) was historically the common name for Iran. In 1935, Reza Shah asked foreign delegates to use the term Iran, the historical name of the country, used by its native people, in formal correspondence.
 Reconstruction of old cities.
 Abolition of slavery.
 Abolition of harem.

Family and personal life

Reza Shah married, for the first time, Maryam Savadkoohi, who was his cousin, in 1894. The marriage lasted until Maryam's death in 1904, the couple had a daughter:

 Princess Hamdamsaltaneh Pahlavi (1903–1992)

Reza Shah's second wife was Nimtaj Ayromlou, later Tadj ol-Molouk (1896–1982). The couple married in 1916 and when Reza Khan became king, Queen Tadj ol-Molouk was his official wife. They had four children together:

 Princess Shams Pahlavi (1917–1996)
 Mohammad Reza Shah Pahlavi (1919–1980)
 Princess Ashraf Pahlavi (1919–2016)
 Prince Ali Reza Pahlavi (1922–1954).

The third wife of Reza Shah was Turan Amirsoleimani (1905–1995), who was from the Qajar dynasty. The couple married in 1922 but divorced in 1923 and together they had a son:

 Prince Gholam Reza Pahlavi (1923–2017)

Reza Shah's fourth and last wife, Esmat Dowlatshahi (1905–1995), was a member of the Qajar dynasty. She married Reza Shah in 1923 and accompanied him to his exile. Esmat was Reza Shah's favorite wife, who resided at Marble Palace. The couple had five children:

 Prince Abdul Reza Pahlavi (1924–2004)
 Prince Ahmad Reza Pahlavi (1925–1981)
 Prince Mahmoud Reza Pahlavi (1926–2001)
 Princess Fatemeh Pahlavi (1928–1987)
 Prince Hamid Reza Pahlavi (1932–1992).

List of prime ministers
 Mohammad Ali Foroughi (1st Term) (1 November 1925 – 13 June 1926), was a close colleague / friend of Reza Shah (before he became king), was probably also Reza Shah's favorite prime minister.
 Mostowfi ol-Mamalek (6th Term) (13 June 1926 – 2 June 1927)
 Mehdi Qoli Hedayat (2 June 1927 – 18 September 1933)
 Mohammad Ali Foroughi (2nd Term) (18 September 1933 – 3 December 1935)
 Mahmoud Jam (3 December 1935 – 26 October 1939), Mahmoud Jam's son Fereydoun Jam marries Reza Shah's daughter, Princess Shams. 1937
 Ahmad Matin-Daftari (26 October 1939 – 26 June 1940). Reza Shah removed him from office and imprisoned him in 1940 for spying on the UK and Winston Churchill on behalf of Adolf Hitler and Nazi Germany.
 Ali Mansur (26 June 1940 – 27 August 1941)

Titles, styles and honours
Following the overthrow of the Qajar dynasty and becoming the Shahanshah of Iran, he commanded all offices of Iran to address him with his surname and title, "Reza Shah Pahlavi". In the spring of 1950, after the foundation of the National Consultative Assembly, he was given the title "Reza Shah the Great".

Honours
 Czechoslovakia: Collar 1st Class of the Order of the White Lion (1935)
 Denmark: Knight of the Order of the Elephant (20 January 1937)
 Sweden: Knight of the Royal Order of the Seraphim (10 November 1934)

Notes

References

External links

IRANNOTES.com | High Quality IRANIAN Banknotes and Coins

People of Pahlavi Iran
1878 births
1944 deaths
20th-century monarchs of Persia
20th-century Iranian people
People from Mazandaran Province
Commanders-in-Chief of Iran
Critics of Islamism
Critics of religions
Iranian anti-communists
Iranian nationalists
Iranian secularists
Leaders who took power by coup
Mazandarani people
Prime Ministers of Iran
World War II political leaders
Monarchs who abdicated
Collars of the Order of the White Lion
People from Savadkuh
Imperial Iranian Army brigadier generals
Exiled politicians
People exiled to Mauritius
Recipients of the Order of the White Eagle (Poland)